This is a list of notable primary and secondary schools in Rivers State, Nigeria, sorted by local government area. It includes both public and private schools that are currently in operation.

Bonny
 Spring Foundation School
Faith Academy Bonny Island
Karibima Primary School
Government girls Secondary school
Ibi-Tamuno School
NLNG School
Bonny National Grammar School
Community Secondary School
Faithword Academy
logos International school
Kingdom Heritage
King and queen school
 Lucille Education Centre

Etche
 CITA International School
NOBSAMS INTERNATIONAL SCHOOL
COMMUNITY SECONDARY SCHOOL EGWI ETCHE
GREAT WILL ACADEMY, Igbo-Etche formally known as Great Child Investment, Igbo-Etche 
Community Secondary School, Chokota Igbo-etche 
Regeneration Missionary Academy, Ozuzu Etche 
Community Grammar school, Etche 
Community Secondary School,  Egwi-Etche 
State Primary school, Igbo-Etche 
Community Secondary School, Okoroagu Etche 
Golden Gate INT'L. School, Umuebulu II
Vibrant Child School, Umuebulu, Etche

Gokana
 Saint Pius X College, Bodo City (owned by the Catholic)
 Community Secondary School, Deeyor
 Community Secondary School, Bomu
 Community Secondary School, K-Dere
 Community Secondary School, B.Dere
 Bua-Yeghe Community Secondary School, Yeghe
 Community Secondary School, Biara
 Government Girls Secondary School, Bodo City
 Government Secondary School, Kpor
 Community Secondary School, Deken
 Community Secondary School, Lewe
 Community Secondary School, Nwe-ol
 Community Secondary School, Barako
 Community Secondary School, Bera
 Community Secondary School, Mogho
[Note: Government secondary schools only, except Saint Pius Bodo City that is now being controlled by the Catholic Mission]

Ikwerre
 Brookstone School Secondary
 Charles Dale Memorial International School
 Emarid College
 Jesuit Memorial College, Aluuccss

Obio-Akpor
 Archdeacon Crowther Memorial Girls' School, Elelenwo.
 KADOSHLAND INTERNATIONAL ' SCHOOL, 4 Omachi street
 Ash Merlyn International School, Elelenwo
 Ave Maria International Academy, East West Road
 CITA International School, Rumuogba
 De World International Secondary School
 Emilio Piazza Memorial School, Rumuigbo
 Government Secondary School, Eneka
 Jephthah Comprehensive Secondary School
 La Pierre Angulaire High School
 Loretto School of Childhood, Rumuigbo
 Marygold International School, Elelenwo
 Niger Delta Science School
 St. Benedict Immaculate Canadian Academy
 St Maria Goretti's School
 St. Scholarstica International Schools, Orazi Mile 4
 Shalom International School
 Topline Schools, Elelenwo
 Trans Amadi International School
 Titare Star Royal Academy, Off Okporo Rd, Port Harcourt
 Rockbase International School, Choba
 University Demonstration Secondary School, Aluu
 University Demonstration Primary School, Uniport
Apostolic Faith Secondary School, Port Harcourt.
Gloria Educational Center, Port Harcourt.
Community secondary school, ogbogoro.

Oyigbo
 Bishop Okoye Spiritan Secondary School, Afam

Port Harcourt

 Baptist High School, Borokiri
 Bereton Montessori Nursery and Primary School, Old GRA
CrestForth International School
 Emarid College
 Faith Baptist College, Old GRA
 Government Comprehensive Secondary School, Borokiri
 Greenoak International School, New GRA
 Holy Rosary College, Old GRA
 Methodist Girls High School
 Norwegian International School
 Our Lady of Fatima College, Borokiri
 St. Mary's Catholic Model High School
 Starlets Academy, Old GRA
 Stella Maris College
 Stepping Stone Educational Centre
 Tantua International Group of Schools

Khana
Birabi Memorial Grammar School, Bori
 Beeri High School, Beeri
 Government Secondary School, Lumene-Bangha
 Government Secondary School, Kabangha
 Government Comprehensive High School, Taabaa
 Government Secondary School, Kaa
 Government Secondary School, Sogho
 Government Secondary School, Luawii
 Government Secondary School, Buako
 Community Secondary School, Bianu
 Community Secondary School, Kono
 Community Secondary School, Uegwere-Boue
 Community Secondary School, Kono-Boue
 Community Secondary School, Kaani
 Community Secondary School, Bori
 Community Secondary School, Wiiyaakara
 Community Secondary School, Lueku
 Community Secondary School, Okwale
 Government Secondary School, Kpean
 Government Secondary School, Baen
 Government Secondary School, Sii
 Buanama Community Secondary School, Gwara

(Please note: Public Secondary Schools, only.)
Reference: Nwisane, Clifford Bariton

See also

 List of schools in Nigeria
Community Secondary School, Lorre

References

Schools